Royston Dias (born 30 June 1993) is an Indian cricketer who plays for Mumbai in domestic cricket. Born in Vasai, Maharashtra, he is a left-handed batsman and a left-arm medium bowler. He was brought by Delhi Daredevils for 2013 Indian Premier League. He made his List A debut for Mumbai in the 2017–18 Vijay Hazare Trophy on 6 February 2018.

References

1993 births
Living people
Delhi Capitals cricketers
Indian cricketers
People from Thane
Mumbai cricketers